Zero Skateboards is a skateboard company located in Carlsbad, California, United States. The brand was founded by professional skateboarder and entrepreneur Jamie Thomas, and distributed by his Black Box Distribution company. In late June 2014, Thomas announced that the brand would be distributed by the Dwindle Distribution company, based in El Segundo, California. Subsequently, in 2016, Thomas and Dwindle announced that Zero Skateboards would be operated independently by Thomas.

History
The Zero brand was originally a clothing company, formed in 1996, and subsequently evolved into a skateboard company, with Thomas leaving Toy Machine to become Zero's first professional team rider.

In early 2003, Thomas opened a plant in Tijuana, Mexico, named "Edieth and Osuna", to manufacture the skateboard decks of the Black Box brands. Zero team rider Chris Cole was a shareholder of the company from 2011 to 2014.

The company has released seven videos, with the premiere of the latest release, Cold War, occurring on November 8, 2013. The premiere was held at the La Paloma theater in Encinitas, California, and Thomas invited every Zero rider, former and current, onto the stage prior to the showing of the 40-minute video.

Transition to Dwindle
In a June 2014 interview with the Jenkem online publication, Thomas explained that the Dwindle Distribution company—responsible for the Enjoi, Blind Skateboards, Almost Skateboards, Darkstar and Cliché Skateboards brands—will take over "the sales, finance, production and distribution aspects" of the Zero brand. Thomas further explained that the Zero employees will remain independent and will focus on "the team, marketing and creative aspects" of the brand. Zero celebrated its 20-year anniversary with a photo art show in June 2016.

Awards
From 2004 to 2006, Zero won three consecutive Thrasher Magazine King of the Road competitions, beating other teams such as Girl Skateboards, Toy Machine, Darkstar, Element, Flip, Habitat, Real, Almost, and Baker Skateboards. Zero declined defending their title for the 2007 King of the Road to start the "Black and White" tour with the Mystery skateboard team.

Cole won Thrasher S.O.T.Y. award (Skateboarder of the Year) on two occasions, a feat that has only been achieved by two skateboarders in the history of the award (the other skateboarder is Danny Way).

Popular culture
 The graphic of the skull used on their "Small Skull"/"Single Skull Mini" board is nearly identical to the skull seen on the shirt worn by Sid in the 1995 animated film Toy Story.
 Soundtrack "I'm Gonna Be (500 Miles)" of John Rattray's part in Dying to Live video, originally performed by The Proclaimers, was twice covered by MxPx and Less Than Jake, not long after video release. Soundtrack Another Girl, Another Planet of Garrett Hill's part in New Blood video, originally performed by The Only Ones, was also covered by Blink-182 and included to their Greatest Hits album, which was also released in the same year with "New Blood" video.

Videography
Thrill of It All (1997)
Misled Youth (1999)
Dying to Live (2002)
New Blood (2005)
Promo (2006)
Strange World (2009)
Fresh 'til Death (feat. DGK) (2011)
Cold War (2013)
No Ca$h Value (2014)
Damn It All (2020)
Painkiller The Zero Am Video (2021)

Team

Professional
 Jamie Thomas
 Chris Cole
 Dane Burman
 Tommy Sandoval
 Jon Allie 
 Adrian Lopez
 Winsdor James
 James Brockman
 Tony Cervantes
 Chris Wimer
 Gabriel Summers
 Forrest Edwards

Amateur
 Reggie Kelly
 Adam Arunski
 Jonno Gaitan
 Colin Lambert
 Motic Panugalinog
 Gustavo Servin
 Brandon Burleigh
 Vinny Dalfio
 Kanaan Dern
 Kairi Netsuke

Former
 Erik Ellington
 Jim Greco
 John Rattray
 Elissa Steamer
 Tom Asta
 Shane Schilder
 Marisa Dal Santo
 Ed Duff
 Ben Gilley
 Ryan Smith
 Lindsey Robertson
 Garrett Hill
 Jamie Tancowny
 Nick Boserio 
 Sheldon Meleshinski
 Ryan Bobier
 Keegan Sauder
 Matt Mumford
 Niels Breed
 Tom Karangelov
 Donovon Piscopo
 Ben Hatchell
 Josiah Gatlyn
 Franky Villani
 Scott Copalman
 Aaron Harrison
 Wade Burkitt
 Jud Ferguson
 Kurt Hodge

References

External links
 Official website

Skateboarding companies
Companies based in Carlsbad, California
Companies established in 1996